LJ Air or Longjiang Airlines Co.Ltd is a scheduled airline based at Harbin Taiping International Airport, Harbin, China. It commenced its first flight on 10 February 2017 from Harbin to Hefei. The airline earlier was scheduled to launch operations from June 2016 but it was delayed. It commenced services with two Airbus A321s. It received its AOC certificate in February 2017.

History 
LJ Air or Longjiang Airlines was founded in 2014 with its headquarters in Harbin, China. It was to start its operations in December 2015, but was delayed. The airline then wanted to start operations in June 2016 but again was delayed in receiving its AOC certificate, which it finally received in February 2017. It finally started operations on 10 February 2017, operating the flight between Harbin and Hefei with an Airbus A321. It currently has a fleet of one Airbus 320 and two Airbus A321s.

Destinations 
As of January 2020, LJ Air serves five destinations in China. It plans to open up new services to other destinations to China in the coming years.

Fleet 

, the LJ Air fleet includes the following aircraft:

See also 
 List of airlines of China

References

External links 
 
 Debit and credit disputes with Shanghai Zendai Group
 Debit and credit disputes with Hifur Group
 Debit and credit disputes with China Aircraft Leasing Group Holdings Limited

2014 establishments in China
Airlines of China
Chinese brands
Airlines established in 2014